The Bowdon Railway was founded in 1910 and began operations in 1911.  It ran a 12-mile section of track between Bowdon, Georgia and a connection with the Central of Georgia Railroad at Bowdon Junction, Georgia.  The line was abandoned in late 1963.

Defunct Georgia (U.S. state) railroads